The institutionalization of politics (also spelled as institutionalisation of politics), commonly known as political institutionalization or political institutionalisation, refers to the founding, arrangement, and codification of the states' various institutions, generally via constitution-making or some other constitutional mechanisms. It is the process by which political structures and practices take root.

Definition
Political institutionalization means that political initiatives have been increasingly constrained by both formal and informal rules or norms. And through the process of political institutionalization, the state-society nexus has been enhanced.

Samuel Huntington defines political institutionalization as "the process by which organizations and procedures acquire value and stability", and regards it as equivalent to political development.

References 

Politics
Political theories
Political terminology